Egil Vike Søby (born 25 November 1945) is a retired Norwegian sprint canoeist. He competed in the four-man 1000 m sprint at the 1968 and 1972 Olympics and won a gold and a bronze medal, respectively. Between 1966 and 1971 Søby collected six medals in various events at the world and European championships, including two gold medals in K-4 10,000 m.

References

External links

1945 births
Canoeists at the 1968 Summer Olympics
Canoeists at the 1972 Summer Olympics
Living people
Norwegian male canoeists
Olympic canoeists of Norway
Olympic gold medalists for Norway
Olympic bronze medalists for Norway
Olympic medalists in canoeing
ICF Canoe Sprint World Championships medalists in kayak

Medalists at the 1972 Summer Olympics
Medalists at the 1968 Summer Olympics
Sportspeople from Tønsberg